The 1985–86 Serie A season was the 52nd season of the Serie A, the top level of ice hockey in Italy. 10 teams participated in the league, and HC Merano won the championship by defeating Asiago Hockey in the final.

Regular season

Playoffs

Play-outs 
 HC Brunico - SG Cortina 2:1 (5:1, 1:3, 3:2)
 HC Gherdëina - HC Fassa 0:2 (4:9, 2:5)

Relegation 
 HC Gherdëina - SG Cortina 0:2 (8:9, 3:8)

External links
 Season on hockeyarchives.info

Serie
Serie A (ice hockey) seasons
Italy